Kanespi (also Romanized as Kānespī; also known as Āq Bolāgh, Kānesbī, and Kānī Sefīd) is a village in Beradust Rural District, Sumay-ye Beradust District, Urmia County, West Azerbaijan Province, Iran. At the 2006 census, its population was 102, in 15 families.

References 

Populated places in Urmia County